"The Outside" is a song written and recorded by American musical duo Twenty One Pilots, released through Fueled by Ramen on May 21, 2021, as the fourth song from their sixth studio album, Scaled and Icy (2021). It was written and produced by the duo's frontman, Tyler Joseph.

With the release of "The Outside (Live from Mexico)" the band announced via Twitter that they were planning to record an official music video for the song after the holidays are over. The video was released on March 18, 2022.

Music video

The music video for the song was released on March 18, 2022. It begins with a scene of a water dragon, which fades into a room containing the nine bishops in the fictional city of Dema that then proceed to kill one of their own. As the video continues, it shows Joseph washing up on the shore of an island, which goes by the name of "Voldsøy", located on the conceptual continent known as "Trench". As Joseph is laying on the ocean shore, Dun finds him, gives him a skullcap and instructs him to follow him. Joseph obliges and the duo make their way through the island's forests and plains, before stopping at a cave containing an antlered creature (this creature has appeared in previous media for the duo, most notably the music video for "Chlorine"). At the entrance to the cave lay cloaks with symbols emblazoned on them, as well as wearable cages containing old bones, which the duo put on as they enter. While they traverse the cave, they stumble upon a group of antlered creatures. Joseph sits down with them and drinks an unknown substance given to him by the creatures, but notices a lone one who wants him to follow. As they leave the cave together, the creature gives him his antlers and disappears. Joseph then places the antlers above his head, which allows him to take control of the dead bishop in Dema, bring him back to life, and have power over his movements. Joseph breaks one of the neon gravestones in the room of bishops, then releases the bishop from control by immolating the bishop to death from a fire caused by the neon light damage. The video cuts to a shot of Joseph and Dun standing side by side in the night, looking off into the distance as they see the torches of the "Banditos", a rebellion against the city of Dema, and the rebels look back at them. The video then focuses on a certain duo of the Banditos, and as they look back at the now-flaming Dema, it is revealed that they are the same duo who found the other Banditos' jumpsuits in the end of the "Nico and the Niners" music video.

Live performances
On December 16, 2021, the Twenty One Pilots YouTube channel released a video of the band performing the song at the Corona Capital Festival in Mexico City, Mexico.

Charts

Release history

References

2021 singles
2021 songs
Twenty One Pilots songs
Songs written by Tyler Joseph
Fueled by Ramen singles